Ok Alright A Huh Oh Yeah is the second and final album by Schnell Fenster.  It was released only in Australia and New Zealand. The album peaked at number 117 in July 1991

Track listing
 All tracks by Schnell Fenster unless otherwise noted

"Ok Alright A Huh Oh Yeah"
"Happy Feet" (music: Judd)
"Fun City" (music: Den Elzen)
"Hot Body" (music: Den Elzen, Judd)
"Fire Ball"
"Heroes Let You Down"
"Rebecca" (music: Den Elzen, Judd)
"Same Boat"
"Buried Alive"
"Vivid Imagination"
"Black Flower"

Personnel
Schnell Fenster
 Phil Judd - guitar, keyboards, vocals; drum programming on "Happy Feet", trumpet on "Heroes Let You Down"
 Nigel Griggs - bass guitar, backing vocals
 Noel Crombie - drums, percussion, backing vocals
 Michael den Elzen - guitars, keyboards, drum programming, backing vocals; bass on "Fun City"
with:
Venetta Fields - backing vocals

Charts

References

Schnell Fenster albums
1991 albums
Atlantic Records albums